Sharmila Devi is an Indian field hockey player. She hails from Hisar, Haryana.

Career 
She made her international debut against the USA in the 2019 Women's FIH Olympic Qualifiers, where she scored a goal.

In 2021, she was selected as part of the Indian squad which would participate in the Tokyo Olympics.

References

External links

Sharmila Devi at Hockey India

2001 births
Indian female field hockey players
Living people
People from Hisar (city)
Olympic field hockey players of India
Field hockey players at the 2020 Summer Olympics
Field hockey players from Haryana
Sportswomen from Haryana
Field hockey players at the 2022 Commonwealth Games
Commonwealth Games bronze medallists for India
Commonwealth Games medallists in field hockey
Medallists at the 2022 Commonwealth Games